Adolfo Quiros (February 1, 1853 – 1910) was a Chilean poet and public servant.

References

19th-century Chilean poets
Chilean male poets
1853 births
1910 deaths
People from Santiago
19th-century male writers